Senate elections for a third of the Senate were held in the Czech Republic on 12 and 13 October 2012, with a second round of voting on 19 and 20 October.

Results

References

2012
Senate election
Czech Senate election|